Soundarya was an Indian actress who worked predominantly in Telugu films.

Soundarya may also refer to:

People
Soundarya Bala Nandakumar, an Indian singer and actress
Soundarya Jayamala, an Indian actress
Soundarya Sharma, an Indian actress and model who works in Hindi films
Saundarya Rajesh, an Indian social entrepreneur 
Soundarya Rajinikanth, an Indian film producer and director who primarily works in Tamil films

Other uses
Saundarya Lahari, a Sanskrit literary work by Adi Shankara